Brady Barke is the current director of athletics for Southeast Missouri State University. He previously served as an associate athletic director for Southeast Missouri State. Barke attended college at Southeast Missouri State University, Southern Illinois University, and Webster University. At Webster, Barke played on the school's basketball and golf teams. Barke was named interim athletic director at Southeast Missouri State on August 2, 2015, before being named permanent athletic director on June 8, 2016.

References

External links
 
Southeast Missouri State Redhawks bio

Living people
Southeast Missouri State Redhawks athletic directors
Webster University alumni
Southeast Missouri State University alumni
Southern Illinois University School of Law alumni
Year of birth missing (living people)